Adam Leitman Bailey is an American lawyer who practices residential and commercial real estate law as founder of Adam Leitman Bailey, P.C. He has engaged in several notable legal cases.
The Martindale-Hubbell peer review system gave Bailey an AV rating, its highest category.

Background 
Bailey was born in Bayside, Queens. He moved to California at age five and later moved back to New Milford, New Jersey, where he  graduated from New Milford High School. He graduated with honors from Rutgers University and Syracuse University College of Law.

Notable cases 
In 2008, Bailey formed a non-profit entity known as "Save Harlem" to challenge certain zoning changes being proposed by the City of New York, and to serve as lead plaintiff in a challenge to the proposed demolition of a two-story building at 125th Street and Frederick Douglass Boulevard, and the development of the site as a shopping center. Bailey proposed legislation that would prevent the demolition. Early in 2008, Save Harlem, along with several building tenants (forming a group known as the Coalition to Save Harlem) sued, eventually settling for more than $1 million and gaining the right of the tenants to remain in the building.

Park51 was a planned Muslim community center located near the site of the World Trade Center. Timothy Brown, a former firefighter, sued to prevent construction of the community center so close to the site of the September 11 attacks. Bailey represented the community center on a pro bono basis, and in July 2011 the New York Supreme Court held that Park51 would be permitted to build its proposed center.

Trump SoHo New York is a $450 million 46-story 391-unit hotel condominium in SoHo, New York City.  In February 2011, several prospective buyers of condominiums in the building, including French soccer star Olivier Dacourt, sued the developers in federal court, claiming that they had been tricked into buying the condos by the "deceptive" sales figures, and that the number of apartments sold at Trump Soho had been "fraudulently misrepresented." The plaintiffs were represented by Bailey. Ultimately the suit was settled, with plaintiffs recovering 90 per cent of their deposits.  Several years later, however, the case has been described as "a watershed case in the world of condo litigation.  * * * [C]ondo attorneys said that developers are now far more reluctant to disclose sales information to buyers’ attorneys, for fear of legal repercussions if they turn out to be wrong.”

Following the financial crisis of 2007-08, Bailey used the Interstate Land Sales Full Disclosure Act of 1968, known as ("ILSA"), to relieve purchasers in Sky View Parc, a $1 billion condominium complex in Queens, of their contractual obligations to purchase, and in so doing was able to obtain the largest residential condominium settlement in New York history.  The condominium was ordered to refund 75 per cent of the $5 million in down payments to the buyers who ended up backing out of the $50 million project.  
Bailey has been credited with being the first lawyer to use the law in this fashion, and he employed the same approach in a later case in an appeal of an adverse trial court decision to the United States Court of Appeals for the Second Circuit.

Congress later closed the ILSA loophole with Public Law 113-167, which provides an exemption for condominiums from ILSA's registration requirements for all new construction after enactment.

Bailey has been described as a controversial figure in NYC real estate.

Suspension of law license 
On May 3, 2019, Bailey was suspended from practicing law for a four-month term. The suspension was imposed for undignified conduct (including telling a party suing Bailey's client that he "should commit suicide") and for threatening criminal charges to obtain an advantage in a civil matter.  The suspension ended in September, 2019, and Bailey was able to return to the practice of law.

Author 
In 2011, Bailey wrote Finding The Uncommon Deal: A Top New York Lawyer Explains How to Buy a Home for the Lowest Possible Price. The book gained Bailey the 2012 "First Time Author" award granted by the National Association of Real Estate Editors.

Bailey has also written a children’s book, Home, which was named as a Silver winner in the category Picture Book/Early Reader by Literary Classics.

Honors 
Bailey was named one of New York's Top Real Estate litigators by Chambers & Partners in 2021 

Bailey was named one of New York’s "Most Powerful Real Estate Attorneys" by the Commercial Observer  in 2015.

References

External links 
Law firm website

1970 births
Living people
New York (state) lawyers
People from New Milford, New Jersey
People from Bayside, Queens
Rutgers University alumni
Syracuse University College of Law alumni